Kallapart  is an unreleased Indian Tamil action thriller drama film written and directed by Rajapandi. This remake of At The End Of The Tunnel film, stars Aravind Swami and Regina Cassandra in the lead roles. Nivas K. Prasanna scores music for the film and editing is handled by S. Elayaraja. Principal photography of the film believed to have commenced in between September 2018 to October 2018. The film was projected to release in the summer of 2019, but the release date was postponed to 24 June 2022.

Cast 

 Arvind Swami
 Regina Cassandra
 Hareesh Peradi
 Baby Monica

Production 
The filming began during October 2018 with Arvind Swami signing onto play the lead role while he was busy while shooting for multi-starrer action film Chekka Chivantha Vaanam which is directed by popular film director Mani Ratnam. It was reported that about 3/4th portions of the film were shot in Chennai and a major set was revealed to have erected in AVM Studios in Chennai where most of the portions of the film were predominantly shot. Actress Regina Cassandra was roped into play the role of a choreographer in the film in the female lead opposite Arvind Swami. The film is produced by Moving Frame Productions which previously produced Vikram starrer Sketch.

References 

Unreleased Tamil-language films
Indian action drama films
Indian thriller drama films
Indian action thriller films
Films shot in Chennai